CSS David was an American Civil War-era torpedo boat.

Construction
Based upon a design by St. Julien Ravenel, David was built as a private venture by T. Stoney at Charleston, South Carolina, in 1863, and was put under the control of the Confederate States Navy (CSN). The cigar-shaped boat carried a  explosive charge of  gunpowder on the end of a spar projecting forward from her bow. CSS David operated as a semi-submersible: water was taken into ballast tanks so that only the length of the open-top conning tower and the stack for the boiler appeared above water. Designed to operate very low in the water, David resembled in general a submersible submarine; she was, however, strictly a surface vessel.  Operating on dark nights, and using anthracite coal (which burns without smoke), David was nearly as hard to see as a true submarine.

Attack on New Ironsides

On the night of October 5, 1863, David, commanded by Lieutenant William T. Glassell, CSN, left Charleston Harbor to attack the casemate ironclad steamer . The torpedo boat approached undetected until she was within  of the blockader. Hailed by the watch on board New Ironsides, Glassell replied with a blast from a shotgun and David plunged ahead to strike. Her spar torpedo detonated under the starboard quarter of the ironclad, throwing high a column of water which rained back upon the Confederate vessel and put out her boiler fires. Her engine dead, David hung under the quarter of New Ironsides while small arms fire from the Federal ship spattered the water around the torpedo boat.

Believing that their vessel was sinking, Glassell and two others abandoned her; the pilot, Walker Cannon, who could not swim, remained on board. A short time later, Assistant Engineer J. H. Tomb swam back to the craft and climbed on board. Rekindling the fires, Tomb succeeded in getting Davids engine working again, and with Cannon at the wheel, the torpedo boat steamed up the channel to safety. Glassell and Seaman James Sullivan, Davids fireman, were captured. New Ironsides, though not sunk, was damaged by the explosion. US Navy casualties were Acting Ensign C.W.Howard (died of gunshot wound), Seaman William L. Knox (legs broken) and Master at Arms Thomas Little (contusions).

The next four months of Davids existence are obscure. She or other torpedo boats tried more attacks on Union blockaders; reports from different ships claim three such attempts, all unsuccessful, during the remainder of October 1863. On March 6, 1864, David attacked  in the North Edisto River. The torpedo boat struck the blockader first on the port quarter, but the torpedo did not explode. Memphis slipped her chain, at the same time firing ineffectively at David with small arms. Putting about, the torpedo boat struck Memphis again, this time a glancing blow on the starboard quarter; once more the torpedo misfired. Since Memphis had now opened up with her heavy guns, David, having lost part of her stack when rammed, retreated up the river out of range. Memphis, undamaged, resumed her blockading station.

Davids last confirmed action came on April 18, 1864 when she tried to sink the screw frigate . Alert lookouts on board the blockader sighted David in time to permit the frigate to slip her chain, avoid the attack, and open fire on the torpedo boat. Neither side suffered any damage.

The ultimate fate of David is uncertain. Several torpedo boats of this type fell into Union hands when Charleston was captured in February 1865. David may well have been among them.

Wrecks discovered
On January 20, 1998, underwater archaeologist Dr. E. Lee Spence led a Sea Research Society expedition, funded by philanthropist Stanley M. Fulton, to find the remains of the two Confederate torpedo boats shown in various photos taken shortly after the fall of Charleston. Spence's theory was that the two vessels had been abandoned where they lay and were simply filled over as the city expanded. Spence used still existing houses in the pictures to triangulate where they might be. Using a ground penetrating radar, operated by Claude E. "Pete" Petrone of National Geographic Magazine, the expedition located two radar anomalies consistent with what would be expected of the two wrecks. The anomalies were under present-day Tradd Street, so no excavation was done. A post-war letter written by David C. Ebaugh, who supervised the construction of David, described her as abandoned at what was then the foot of Tradd Street.

Other "David"s
"David" came to be the generic term for any torpedo boat resembling this David.
An unknown number of torpedo boats of the David-type were built for and operated by the CSN. This vessel was taken to Washington DC.

References

Torpedo boats of the Confederate States Navy
Ships built in Charleston, South Carolina
1863 ships
Maritime incidents in 1865